Two Guys Garage is an American reality television series on automobile repair and customizing, hosted by Kevin Byrd and Willie B. The series is based in Tampa, Florida.  Two Guys Garage covers virtually every aspect of vehicle repairing, customizing and restoring. The hosts perform product demonstrations and installations on a wide variety of import and domestic cars and light trucks, and they show viewers the right way to execute modifications with hands-on projects throughout the season.

The hosts also visit well-known shops in the performance and engineering industry, and recognized experts occasionally stop by the Two Guys Garage shop to lend their technical authority to the series.

Ongoing projects are a part of every show and provide the basis for new problems to solve. Along with series project vehicles, friends bring in their special cars to have Kevin and Willie help with a performance or dress-up project that solves a specific problem of high interest to viewers.

The show moved to GAC owned by Scripps.  Scripps also owns HGTV, Travel Channel, Food Network, Cook Channel, DIY Network.  These how-to networks reach over one million homes across the US.

Kevin Byrd is a passionate car guy and all around tech junkie.  He got his Mechanical Engineering degree from the University of Florida in 1998 and started his professional career in Advanced Design in Aerospace.  After a couple of years, he bought some warmer clothes and made the trek to the mecca of automotive design, the Motor City.  He has been working in Powertrain Research and Development for one of the “Big Three” OEM’s in Detroit, Michigan since 2000.

Kevin got his start working on cars at an early age and hasn’t looked back.  He’s a certified ASE mechanic, has been professionally schooled in welding, and has worked in fab and machine shops since high school.

You’ve seen Kevin on other top automotive shows including “Rides” and “Overhaulin” on TLC.  He was also the host and builder on the series “Payback” on SPEED channel that feature pimped out rides for some of our favorite celebrities like Jay Leno, Jaimie Pressly, and Dale Earnhardt Jr.

Willie B is a deejay for Denver, CO, rock station 107.9 KBPI, and host of one of the highest-rated morning shows in the market. He’s also a professed drag racing nut, having competed since he was 15 years old.

Willie B has two passions – cars and radio. He began his career in radio at 16 at the historic, yet modest WFMI in Kentucky. Eventually, he found his way to Denver where he built his career at KBPI, and his personality has built a large following with his popular morning show.

“I’m kind of a gearhead, a car guy, and my dad was a car guy and all my friends are car guys,” said Willie, who grew up in Winchester, KY, and began working at KBPI in 1993.

Willie B built a 1968 Dodge Super Bee to compete in SPEED Channel’s PINKS All Out episode at Bandimere Speedway, just outside Denver in 2008.  Word spread of his talents behind the mike and in the car during the filming at Bandimere, and Willie was offered a job as a cast member on the PINKS All Out series.  He spent two seasons traveling with PINKS until the series completed its run on SPEED.

He has restored, rebuilt, crashed, blown up and reworked a number of cars, jeeps, and toys in his lifetime and looks forward to sharing his car knowledge with the viewers of Two Guys Garage.

External links

CURRENTLY AIRING ON GAC (Great American Country) The show aired on SPEED Channel for twelve years.  Current hosts (2013) are Kevin Byrd and Willie B.  The show has begun airing on GAC (Great American Country) in August 2013.   The automotive how-to reality show will be airing Saturday and Sunday AM on GAC.  The show content promotes companies in the automotive aftermarket business.  The company sales and corporate office is in Swansea, MA.  The production studio is in Tampa, FL.  This show produced by Brenton Productions along with Truck U, ALL Girls Garage and Car Fix (All Girls Garage and Car Fix air on Velocity Discovery).

websites for the show - twoguysgarage.com,  truckutv.com

2001 American television series debuts
2000s American reality television series
2010s American reality television series
Speed (TV network) original programming